"L'estate di John Wayne" is a song performed by Italian singer and pianist Raphael Gualazzi. The song was released in Italy as a digital download on 15 July 2016 as the lead single from his forth studio album Love Life Peace (2016). The song peaked at number 43 on the Italian Singles Chart, and was later certified platinum by the Federation of the Italian Music Industry.

Music video
A music video to accompany the release of "L'estate di John Wayne" was first released onto YouTube on 14 July 2016 at a total length of three minutes and twenty-six seconds.
The video was directed by Jacopo Rondinelli.

Track listing

Charts

Weekly charts

Release history

References

2016 songs
2016 singles
Sugar Music singles
Songs written by Raphael Gualazzi